Fallen Idols is the fifth full-length album by the Australian heavy metal band Lord. Their first album in six years, it was released in Australia in August 2019, by the band's own label Dominus. Drummer Tim Yatras returns as a session member for this album. The Colombian artist Felipe Machado Franco designed the art, as he had done for the previous two Lord albums.

The album's first single and music video "United (Welcome Back)" was released in February 2019. Fallen Idols hit the Australian Artist Album Charts at #20.

Talking about the influences used for this album, frontman Lord Tim explained, "It’s business as usual really… there’s always been like this big heavy/thrash/extreme metal thing always going through what we’ve been doing for the last 20 years… I think more the production has brought things out more. We put the focus on – we love extreme metal – so we put the focus back on to a lot of the extreme stuff that we love as well as the light stuff as well."

Following the success of this album, bassist Andy Dowling started a 10-part podcast series titled "Nod to the Old School", "all about the old school generation mixtape and metal compilations." Guests who had participated in the podcast include Andy LaRocque (King Diamond), David Ellefson (Megadeth), Johnny Dee (Doro), and Lord Tim, among others.

Track listing

Personnel
 Lord Tim – vocals, guitars, keyboards
 Tim Yatras – drums
 Andrew Dowling – bass guitar, backing vocals
 Mark Furtner - guitar, keyboards, backing vocals

References

Lord (band) albums
2019 albums